While the Australia national cricket team was touring South Africa in 1969–70, another Australian team captained by Sam Trimble toured New Zealand between late February and early April. They played three matches against New Zealand, but these were not granted Test status.

The Australians also played first-class matches against New Zealand Under-23, Central Districts, Northern Districts, Canterbury and Otago. The Australians beat Otago and New Zealand Under-23, and all the other games were drawn.

Team

 Sam Trimble (captain)
 Derek Chadwick 
 Greg Chappell 
 Geoff Davies 
 John Inverarity 
 Terry Jenner 
 Dennis Lillee 
 John Maclean 
 Kerry O'Keeffe
 David Renneberg 
 Tony Steele 
 Alan Thomson 
 Alan Turner 
 Graeme Watson

References

Further reading
 Don Neely & Richard Payne, Men in White: The History of New Zealand International Cricket, 1894–1985, Moa, Auckland, 1986, pp. 419–22
 Wisden 1971, pp. 904–15

1970 in Australian cricket
1970 in New Zealand cricket
New Zealand cricket seasons from 1945–46 to 1969–70
1969-70
International cricket competitions from 1960–61 to 1970